Nigel Leathern (1 June 1932 – 25 September 2012) was a South African cricketer. He played four first-class matches for Northerns between 1957 and 1959.

References

External links
 

1932 births
2012 deaths
South African cricketers
Northerns cricketers
Cricketers from Pietermaritzburg